Wilcox State Prison is a Georgia Department of Corrections state prison for men located in Abbeville, Wilcox County, Georgia.

The facility opened in 1994, and has a maximum capacity of 1827 medium-security prisoners.

References

Prisons in Georgia (U.S. state)
Buildings and structures in Wilcox County, Georgia
1994 establishments in Georgia (U.S. state)